Skimmianine is a furoquinoline alkaloid found in Skimmia japonica, a flowering plant in family Rutaceae that is native to Japan and China. It is also a strong acetylcholinesterase (AChE) inhibitor.

Biosynthesis 
The biosynthesis of skimmianine starts from anthranilic acid, which is very abundant in the family Rutaceae. By combining anthranilic acid acetate, anthraniloyl-CoA is formed as a starting unit and able to extend side chain by adding malonyl-CoA by Claisen condensation. Next, lactam is formed through the cyclization and generate a heterocyclic system, leading the dienol tautomer adopt the 4-hydroxy quinolone tautomer, which is 4-hydroxy-2-quinolone.

With the formation of quinolone, alkylation is happening at C-3 position by introducing dimethylallyl diphosphate. Another key step is the cyclization on the dimethylallyl sidechain, forming a new heterocyclic five-member-ring. Platydesmine is then forming an intermediate through the oxidative cleavage reaction by losing an isopropyl group to form dictamine. Finally, skimmianine is formed through the hydroxylation of dictamine.

References 

Quinoline alkaloids
Furans
Plant toxins